The 2019 RFL Women's Super League known as the Betfred Women's Super League for sponsorship reasons was the third season of the Rugby League Women's Super League for female players in clubs affiliated to the Rugby Football League.

The champions were Leeds Rhinos who beat Castleford Tigers 20–12 in the Grand Final on 11 October 2019. Castleford Tigers won the league leaders shield, a 44–0 win over York City Knights in round 13 put them three points clear of nearest rivals, St Helens, with a round to spare.

For 2019, the number of teams was expanded from seven to eight, with the addition of Wakefield Trinity to the league.

The season comprised 14 rounds, with each team playing each other home and away, commencing on 7 April and ending on 29 September.  Following the regular season, the top four teams played off against each other in two semi-finals, with the Grand Final played on Friday 11 October, at the Totally Wicked Stadium in St Helens and broadcast live on Sky Sports.

On 15 August 2019 it was announced that Betfred would become the sponsors of the league with immediate effect in a deal that will run until the end of the 2021 season.

The defending champions were Wigan Warriors, who beat League Leaders Shield winners Leeds Rhinos, 18–16 at the Grand Final at the Manchester Regional Arena. Wigan were eliminated from the play-offs after they lost 34–4 to Castleford Tigers in the semifinals.

Teams

Fixtures and results

Round 1

Round 2

Round 3

Round 4

Round 5

Round 6

Round 7

Round 8

Round 9

Round 10

Round 11

Round 12

Round 13

Round 14

Play-off semi-finals

Grand final

Leeds completed a league and cup double with 20–12 victory over Castleford in the Grand Final on 11 October 2019.  In a game televised live on Sky Sports Castleford took an early advantage with two tries in the first five minute; the scorers being Maisie Lumb and Lacey Owen.  Leeds pulled a try back through Hollie Dodd and these were the only points of the first half with the half-time score being 8–4 to Castleford.

In the second half, it was Leeds who proved to be the stronger side with three tries in close succession, two for 16-year old winger Fran Goldthorp and one for Elle Frain.  Leeds captain Courtney Hill converted two of the tries to give Leeds a 20–8 lead. Kelsey Gentles did score a late try for Castleford to make the score 20–12 but it was too late for Castleford to catch up.

Standings

References

External links
Women and girls rugby league

RFL Women's Super League
RFL Women's Super League
RFL Women's Super League
RFL Women's Super League